is a railway station in Mooka, Tochigi Prefecture, Japan, operated by the Mooka Railway.

Lines
Kitamōka Station is a station on the Mooka Line, and is located 18.0 rail kilometers from the terminus of the line at Shimodate Station.

Station layout
Kitamōka Station has a single side platform serving traffic in both directions. A shelter is provided on the platform, and parking is available for bikes and cars. The station is unmanned.

History
Kitamōka Station opened on 1 April 1955 as a station on the Japanese National Railways (JNR). The station was absorbed into the JR East network upon the privatization of the JNR on 1 April 1987, and then the Mooka Railway on 11 April 1988.

Surrounding area
Japan National Route 294
Mooka Nishidai Post Office

References

External links

 Mooka Railway Station information 

Railway stations in Tochigi Prefecture
Railway stations in Japan opened in 1955
Mooka, Tochigi